Matías Osinalde (born 1886, date of death unknown) was an Argentine sports shooter. He competed in the 25 m rapid fire pistol event at the 1924 Summer Olympics.

References

External links
 

1886 births
Year of death missing
Argentine male sport shooters
Olympic shooters of Argentina
Shooters at the 1924 Summer Olympics
Place of birth missing